Cayetana Álvarez de Toledo y Peralta-Ramos, 14th Marchioness of Casa Fuerte, MP (born 15 October 1974 in Madrid) is a Spanish journalist, historian, and politician of the People's Party. She has served as Member of the Congress of Deputies since 21 May 2019 for Barcelona and was Spokesperson of her party in Congress until 21 August 2020. She is of French—Argentine descent.

She was the Member of Congress for the constituency of Madrid in the 9th and 10th Legislatures of the Cortes Generales. She is the current Director of International Relations of FAES. Since her return to journalism she has written for the daily newspaper El Mundo.

Biography
Álvarez de Toledo was born in Madrid to a French father and an Argentine mother. She is the daughter of Juan Illán Álvarez de Toledo y Giraud, the 12th Marquess of Casa Fuerte, who fought as part of the French Resistance during the Second World War, and of Patricia Peralta-Ramos y Madero. She is a citizen of Argentina, France and Spain.

After spending the first seven years of her childhood in London, she moved to Buenos Aires and enrolled in Northlands School. She returned to the United Kingdom to obtain her university degrees. She earned a post-graduate degree in Modern History at New College, University of Oxford, and a PhD in the same field with her dissertation on Juan de Palafox, Viceroy of New Spain, under John H. Elliott. She married Spanish businessman (and her distant cousin) Joaquín Güell (from the family of the Marquesses of Comillas and Counts of Güell) on 20 October 2001. They had two daughters but they divorced in January 2018.

After obtaining her PhD, she became an editor for the daily newspaper El Mundo in September 2000. She was also a guest on the Cadena COPE talk show The Morning, hosted by Federico Jiménez Losantos.

Political career
In 2006 she was appointed Chief of Staff of the leader of the People's Party (PP), Ángel Acebes, with the task of advising Acebes regarding political strategy, managing his agenda and coordinating his speeches in parliament.

She obtained Spanish nationality in 2007 and stood for the 2008 general election as a member of the People's Party for the constituency of Madrid, as number nine on the list, becoming a Member of Parliament in the 9th Cortes Generales. She served as a Deputy Spokesperson of the People's Party Parliamentary Group. She was re-elected in 2011.

As a result of her father's death in Paris in 2012, she inherited the title of Marchioness of Casa Fuerte a year later. She is the 13th holder of the title.

In 2014 she wrote an article in the Financial Times protesting the separatist direction in which Catalan nationalism was perceived to be heading. In 2014 she launched the constitutionalist manifesto Free and Equal. The manifesto rejected all concessions to the Catalan nationalists who desired independence. She was the spokesperson of the homonymous organisation which seeks to involve the Spanish citizenry in the defense of the constitutional provisions of equality for all Spaniards. Among the events organised by Free and Equal was the one which took place on 11 September 2014, the triennial of the defeat of the pro-Habsburg forces in Barcelona during the War of the Spanish Succession, in the Círculo de Bellas Artes of Madrid, where she also gave a speech.

In 2016s she criticised the Cabalgata de Reyes organised by the City Council of Madrid in a Tweet: "My 6-year old daughter: 'Mom, this Gaspar's costume isn't real' I will never forgive you for this, Manuela Carmena. Never." The Tweet received more than six thousand replies and twelve thousand retweets.

On 8 March 2018, she criticised the feminist strike taking place on that same day in a newspaper article. In June 2018 she published an opinion piece after the dissolution of the Mariano Rajoy government resulting from the no confidence motion sponsored by the PSOE. She confirmed that she was still a People's Party member, but voted for the liberal centre-right party Ciudadanos, and she asked for the merging of the two parties.

On 15 March 15, 2019 it was announced that she would run first in the PP list for the Congress of Deputies in the Barcelona constituency in the 28 April 2019 general election. As result of the election she became a member of the lower house, effectively assuming office on 21 May 2019. In July, the party's leader, Pablo Casado, announced that she would be the party's spokesperson for the 13th Congress of Deputies. She continued in the position in the 14th Congress of Deputies until 21 August 2020.

Arms

References

1974 births
20th-century Spanish historians
21st-century women
Living people
Marquesses of Spain
Members of the 9th Congress of Deputies (Spain)
Members of the 10th Congress of Deputies (Spain)
Members of the 13th Congress of Deputies (Spain)
Argentine nobility
21st-century Spanish journalists
Spanish people of Argentine descent
Spanish people of French descent
Spanish women journalists
Women members of the Congress of Deputies (Spain)
Members of the 14th Congress of Deputies (Spain)
20th-century Spanish women